The A. J. Jernigan House, known as Las Ventanas, is a historic home in west-central Austin, Texas, United States. The home was designed and built in 1875 for Mr. Jernigan, then the Travis County treasurer, by noted master builder Abner Cook.

The home was expanded in the late 1880s and 1912. In the late 20th century it served as commercial office space, before being renovated near the start of the 21st century for use as a single-family home again.

The home is located at 602 Harthan Street. It was added to the National Register of Historic Places in 1983.

References 

Houses in Austin, Texas
Houses on the National Register of Historic Places in Texas
National Register of Historic Places in Austin, Texas
City of Austin Historic Landmarks
Houses completed in 1875
1875 establishments in Texas